David T. Dellinger (August 22, 1915 – May 25, 2004) was an American pacifist and an activist for nonviolent social change. He achieved peak prominence as one of the Chicago Seven, who were put on trial in 1969.

Early life and schooling 
Dellinger was born in Wakefield, Massachusetts to a wealthy family. He was the son of Maria Fiske and Raymond Pennington Dellinger; his father was an alumnus of Yale University, a lawyer, and a prominent Republican and friend of Calvin Coolidge. His maternal grandmother, Alice Bird Fiske, was active in the Daughters of the American Revolution.

Dellinger graduated from Yale University with a Bachelor of Arts in economics, began a doctorate for a year at New College, Oxford, and studied theology at Union Theological Seminary of Columbia University with the intention of becoming a Congregationalist minister. At Yale he had been a classmate and friend of the economist and political theorist Walt Rostow. Rejecting his comfortable background, he walked out of Yale one day to live with hobos during the Depression. While at Oxford University, he visited Nazi Germany and drove an ambulance during the Spanish Civil War. Dellinger, who opposed the war's victorious Nationalist faction, led by Francisco Franco, later recalled, "After Spain, World War II was simple. I wasn't even tempted to pick up a gun to fight for General Motors, U.S. Steel, or the Chase Manhattan Bank, even if Hitler was running the other side."

Political career
During World War II, he was an imprisoned conscientious objector and anti-war agitator. In federal prison, he and fellow conscientious objectors, including Ralph DiGia and Bill Sutherland, protested racial segregation in the dining halls, which were ultimately integrated because of the protests. He sat on the executive committee of the Socialist Party of America and the Young People's Socialist League, its youth section, until he left in 1943. In February 1946, Dellinger helped to found the radical pacifist Committee for Nonviolent Revolution. In 1948, he co-founded the Central Committee for Conscientious Objectors. He was also a long-time member of the War Resisters League, joining the staff in March 1955. In July–November 1951, Dellinger participated in the Paris-to-Moscow bicycle trip for disarmament with Ralph DiGia, Bill Sutherland, and Art Emery and sponsored by the Peacemakers; cyclists got as far as the headquarters of the Soviet Army in Vienna. “We were warned not to go to the Soviet zone. People who went to the army headquarters were sometimes never seen again. But we didn’t think that would happen to us. The worst that would happen was jail, and I already knew I could stand that. I was only worried about what I was putting my family through back in the States.” The Paris-to-Moscow Bicycle Trip for Disarmament was a key inspiration for the San Francisco to Moscow Walk for Peace in 1960–1961.

In the 1950s and the 1960s, Dellinger joined freedom marches in the South and led many hunger strikes in jail. In 1956, he, Dorothy Day, and A. J. Muste founded the magazine Liberation as a forum for the non-Marxist left that was similar to Dissent. Dellinger had contacts and friendships with such diverse individuals as Eleanor Roosevelt, Ho Chi Minh, Martin Luther King Jr., Abbie Hoffman, A.J. Muste, Greg Calvert, James Bevel, David McReynolds, and numerous Black Panthers such as Fred Hampton, whom he greatly admired. As chair of the Fifth Avenue Vietnam Peace Parade Committee, he worked with many antiwar organizations and helped bring King and Bevel into leadership positions in the 1960s antiwar movement. In 1966 Dellinger travelled to both North and South Vietnam to learn first-hand the impact of American bombing. He later recalled that critics ignored his trip to Saigon and focused solely on his visit to Hanoi. In 1968, he signed the "Writers and Editors War Tax Protest" pledge, vowing to refuse tax payments to protest the Vietnam War, and later became a sponsor of the War Tax Resistance project, which practiced and advocated tax resistance as a form of protest against the war.

Chicago Seven trial
As US involvement in Vietnam grew, Dellinger applied Mahatma Gandhi's principles of nonviolence to his activism within the growing antiwar movement. One of the high points of this was the Chicago Seven trial over allegations that Dellinger and several others had conspired to cross state lines with the intention of inciting a riot, after antiwar protesters had interrupted the 1968 Democratic National Convention in Chicago. The ensuing court case was turned by Dellinger and his co-defendants into a nationally publicized platform for putting the Vietnam War on trial. On February 18, 1970, they were acquitted of the conspiracy charge, but five defendants, including Dellinger, were convicted of crossing state lines to incite a riot.

Judge Julius Hoffman's handling of the trial, along with the FBI's bugging of the defense lawyers, resulted, with the help of the Center for Constitutional Rights, in the convictions being overturned by the Seventh Circuit Court of Appeals two years later. Although the contempt citations were upheld, the appeals court refused to sentence anyone.

Subsequent activities
Dellinger spoke at the December 1971 John Sinclair Freedom Rally in Ann Arbor, Michigan.

In the late 1970s, Dellinger spent two years teaching at Goddard College's Adult Degree Program and Vermont College. In 2001, he was invited back to give the commencement address to the graduating class of Goddard's Residential Undergraduate Program.

Dellinger also was a founder of Seven Days, an American alternative news magazine written from a leftist or anti-establishment perspective. Dellinger obtained the subscription list of Ramparts magazine, which ceased publication in October 1975. Seven Days began preview editions in 1975, published regularly starting in 1977 but ceased publication in 1980. 

In 1986, when his Yale class of 1936 held its 50th reunion, Dellinger wrote in the reunion book: "Lest my way of life sounds puritanical or austere, I always emphasize that in the long run one can't satisfactorily say no to war, violence, and injustice unless one is simultaneously saying yes to life, love, and laughter."

For his lifelong commitment to pacifist values and for serving as a spokesperson for the peace movement, Dellinger was awarded the Peace Abbey Courage of Conscience award on September 26, 1992.

In 1996, during the first Democratic Convention held in Chicago since 1968, Dellinger and his grandson were arrested along with nine others, including Civil Rights Movement historian Randy Kryn, Bradford Lyttle and Abbie Hoffman's son Andrew, during a sit-in at Chicago's Federal Building.

In 2001, Dellinger led a group of young activists from Montpelier, Vermont, to Quebec City to protest a conference that planned to create a free trade zone.

Death 
Dellinger died in Montpelier, Vermont, in 2004 after an extensive stay at Heaton Woods Nursing Home.

Popular culture
Peter Boyle played Dellinger in the 1987 film Conspiracy: The Trial of the Chicago 8.
 Dylan Baker voiced Dellinger in the 2007 animated documentary Chicago 10.
 In the 2010 film The Chicago 8 Dellinger was played by Peter Mackenzie.
 John Carroll Lynch portrayed Dellinger in the 2020 drama film The Trial of the Chicago 7.

Selected works 
 Dellinger, David T., Revolutionary Nonviolence: Essays by Dave Dellinger, Indianapolis : Bobbs-Merrill, 1970
 Dellinger, David T., More Power Than We Know: The People’s Movement Toward Democracy, Garden City, N.Y. : Anchor Press, 1975. 
 Dellinger, David T., Vietnam Revisited: From Covert Action to Invasion to Reconstruction, Boston, MA : South End Press, 1986. 
 Dellinger, David T., From Yale to Jail: The Life Story of a Moral Dissenter, New York : Pantheon Books, 1993. . (Dellinger's autobiography)

See also
 List of peace activists

References

Further reading

 Edited by Mark L. Levine, George C. McNamee and Daniel Greenberg / Foreword by Aaron Sorkin. The Trial of the Chicago 7: The Official Transcript. New York: Simon & Schuster, 2020. . 
 Edited with an introduction by Jon Wiener. Conspiracy in the Streets: The Extraordinary Trial of the Chicago Seven. Afterword by Tom Hayden and drawings by Jules Feiffer. New York: The New Press, 2006. 
 Edited by Judy Clavir and John Spitzer. The Conspiracy Trial: The extended edited transcript of the trial of the Chicago Eight. Complete with motions, rulings, contempt citations, sentences and photographs. Introduction by William Kunstler and foreword by Leonard Weinglass. Indianapolis: Bobbs-Merrill Company, 1970. . 
 Schultz, John. The Conspiracy Trial of the Chicago Seven. Foreword by Carl Oglesby. Chicago: University of Chicago Press, 2020. . (Originally published in 1972 as Motion Will Be Denied.)

 
 Clavir, Judy; and John Spitzer, (eds.), The Conspiracy Trial, Indianapolis, Bobbs-Merrill, 1970
 
 
 Hunt, Andrew (2006). David Dellinger: The Life and Times of a Nonviolent Revolutionary. New York University Press. 
 
 Conspiracy on appeal; appellate brief on behalf of the Chicago Eight. Of Counsel: Arthur Kinoy, Helene E. Schwartz [and] Doris Peterson. New York, Center for Constitutional Rights; distributed by Agathon Publication Services, 1971.

External links 

 Revolutionary Non-Violence: Remembering Dave Dellinger, 1915–2004 – Tribute by Democracy Now!

1915 births
2004 deaths
Activists for African-American civil rights
American anti–Vietnam War activists
American Christian pacifists
American conscientious objectors
American pacifists
American tax resisters
Calvinist pacifists
Chicago Seven
Christian radicals
Industrial Workers of the World members
Members of the Socialist Party of America
Nonviolence advocates
People from Peacham, Vermont
People from Wakefield, Massachusetts
War Resisters League activists
Yale College alumni